John Davidson (1878 – 1970) was a notable Scottish-Canadian botanist.

Biography
He was born in Aberdeen, Scotland.

He worked at the University of Aberdeen from 1893 to 1911. He later moved to Canada in the hopes of securing a professorship at the soon to be established University of British Columbia (UBC).  Instead, he was appointed the first Provincial Botanist of British Columbia. Davidson established a herbarium on West Pender Street, Vancouver, and a botanical garden near New Westminster, at Coquitlam (at the Colony Farm and Essondale farming and mental hospital complex, which later became Riverview Hospital in the 1950s). This collection was moved to the UBC in 1916 where it became the UBC Botanical Garden. This move is often described as having involved the transfer of 25,000 plants, though this figure is an exaggeration. Even if Davidson and his staff transferred two thousand plants, the feat would still have been extraordinary.  As a UBC faculty member in Botany from 1916 to 1948 Davidson was instrumental in developing botany teaching at the University.

He also founded the Vancouver Natural History Society (which has been renamed Nature Vancouver)

Bibliography
Published works (partial list)
 1922: "The Cascara Tree in British Columbia"
 1923: "Commercial Drug Plant Cultivation in British Columbia"
 1933: "Poisonous Plants of British Columbia"
 1942: "The Cascara Tree in British Columbia"
 1943: "Edible Plants of British Columbia"
 1949: "The Cascara Tree in Relation to Drug Farming in British Columbia"

See also
 UBC Botanical Garden
 Mount Davidson

External links
  David Brownstein's 2006 PhD thesis, one chapter of which is on John Davidson (ch 5 John Davidson, the Moses of BC Botany). 
  VICTORIA VS. VANCOUVER: JAMES ROBERT ANDERSON, JOHN DAVIDSON AND BOTANICAL COMPETITION ACROSS THE GEORGIA STRAIT  
 University of British Columbia Library Archive - a list of archival material.
  A blog about "Botany John", with links to UBC's John Davidson website.
  UBC's Virtual Museum of Canada exhibition, Botany John: Legacy of a Canadian Botanist.
 John Davidson

1878 births
1970 deaths
Scottish botanists
20th-century Canadian botanists
British emigrants to Canada